Sayani Palit (born 5 July 1989) is an Indian classical and semi-classical vocalist, playback singer, music composer and performer from Kolkata, West Bengal. Working as a playback singer in Tollywood for the last 5 years, In 2015, Sayani made her Bollywood debut, singing the song, Ove Janiye Reprise for Katti Batti under the direction of Shankar-Ehsaan-Loy. Her biggest break in her musical career took place, when she won the Benadryl Big Golden Voice Season 2 judged by Shankar Mahadevan.

Early life 
Sayani Palit started her musical career when she was just 4 years. She continued her musical tutelage for 20 years under Pandit Ajoy Chakraborty and her wife Chandana Chakraborty. Later, when she was a scholar of ITC Sangeet Research Academy, she took taleem from Padma Bhushan Girija Devi.A first class first in Bachelor's and master's degree in Classical Music from Calcutta University, Sayani is a regular performing artist of All India Radio. Currently she is a Ph.D. research scholar in 'Influence of Thumri in film music'

Professional career
Sayani has worked as playback and background singer for the following tracks:

|-
| 2021 || Malini || Bengali || O Je Mane Na Mana || Playback, Directed by Arpan Basak,

Discography

Singles 
 Ruh Mein Hain-Sur Prabaha(2012) - Self Composed Sufi Song
 Naa Jaane Kyun: Ghazal(2015) - Self composed Ghazal
 Ishq Ki Inteha: Ghazal(2015) - Self composed Ghazal
 Kabhie Kabhie: Indipop(2015) 
 Raat Ke Saaye feat. Abhay Jodhpurkar and Sayani Palit(2016)
 Wo Jab Bhi Udaas: Ghazal(2016) - Self Composed Ghazal
 Reliving Rahman - Celebrating 50  (2017) -A journey through 50 Rahmanious compositions in approx. 1000 seconds
 Garv Se Jiyenge Hum -   Shankar Mahadevan feat.  Sayani Palit (2017) - This production is in support for Enable India

First Album: Khwahishain 
Khwahishain is the first full-fledged self-composed Hindi contemporary album of Sayani Palit released in 2014. This album is a melodic saga which depicts hues of romance through songs of different genres like Indipop, Folk, Ghazal, Experimental and others. The album consists of 6 tracks with Unn Bina being the most popular out of them. Unn Bina is an exclusive 11 beat song which got much popularity due to its creative music video.

Track List:

Track 1 - Ab Jao Na Mohan Mere

Track 2 - Unn Bina

Track 3 - Rahon Mein Humsafar

Track 4 - Khwahishein Dil Mein Jo Thi

Track 5 - Khushiyan Yun Chalke Hain

Track 6 - Dil Mein Khamoshiyan

Track 7 - O Je Mane Na Mana Malini- A Film By Arpan Basak

Other Album 

Rendezvous with Tagore - Jokhhon Eshechhile (2016) Tagore Songs, Rabindranath Tagore

Notuner Daak - Tumi Kon Bhangonero Pathe (2017) Tagore Songs, Rabindranath Tagore

Awards & Recognitions
 Sayani received the State Award for the role model category from the honourable Governor of West Bengal.
 National scholarship award for the young artists. 2010/2011 from the ministry of culture Govt of India.
 1st class 1st in bachelor's degree in 2011 & Masters’ in 2013 under CU
 Currently pursuing PhD in music from CU
 Received Telegraph award for excellence in 2006
 Sayani has been awarded the Benadryl Big Golden Voice of India Season 2 title (judged by Shankar Mahadevan).
 Sayani has recently been nominated as the 'Best Budding Playback Singer' at the Mirchi Music Awards Bangla 2014
 Her recent video "Reliving Rahman" has been appreciated by Music Maestro A. R. Rahman himself

References
 'Pendulum Music Launch', Tollywood Dhamaka, Feb 17, 2014
 'Sayani Palit to make it big in Tollywood', Sholoana Bangaliana, Jun 08, 2015
 'Sayani Records for Shankar-Ehsaan-Loy', Ei Samay, Jul 15, 2015
 'Sayani Palit interviewed by The Statesman after winning Benadryl Big Golden Voice Season 2', The Statesman, Sep 05, 2015
 'Mentioning of Sayani Palit in TOI Review of Katti Batti', Times of India, Sep 11, 2015
 'Sayani Palit wins ticket to Bollywood', Radio and Music, Sep 18, 2015
 'An Afternoon with Sayani Palit', On The Rox E-magazine, Apr 2, 2015
 'Review on Big Golden Voice',  Jan 15, 2015
 'Music review of Movie Katti Batti',  Aug 28, 2015
 'Shankar Mahadevan Plays Mentor To These Lucky People!',  Sep 11, 2015
 'A Fitting Tribute to Rahman', Hindustan Times, Dec - 31, 2016
 'Sayani Palit: Learnt a lot by listening to A.R. Rahman's songs', Business Standard, Jan - 3, 2017
 'রহমানের জন্মদিনে সায়নির সুরেলা শ্রদ্ধা', এই সময়, Jan - 6, 2017
 'Music Maestro A. R. Rahman appreciates Reliving Rahman on twitter',  Jan 11, 2017
 'A Salute to Sayani Palit', Colors TV Mar 03, 2017
 'Press release of the performance at Music Mojo Kappa TV',  
 'The music launch of Kaushik Ganguly’s romantic thriller ‘Drishtikone’', Times Of India Apr 01, 2018
 'Times Baishakhi 1425 soaks in Bengali New Year spirit', Times Of India Apr 17, 2018
 'Latest Bengali Song Yaad Piya Ki Aaye Sung By Sayani Palit', Times Of India Feb 1, 2019
 Seasons Greetings' creates a landmark in Indian cinema'], Times Of India Mar 15, 2019 [https://timesofindia.indiatimes.com/entertainment/bengali/movies/news/nusrat-loves-the-response-to-her-latest-song/articleshow/72865872.cms Nusrat loves the response to her latest song', Times Of India Dec 18, 2019
‘Asur’ song ‘Tor Hoye Jete Chai’ is a treat to musical ears, Times Of India Dec 20, 2019

External links 
 Official Website
 Facebook Fan Page
 Twitter
 YouTube Official Channel

Living people
Indian women singer-songwriters
Bengali singers
1989 births
Singers from Kolkata
21st-century Indian women singers
21st-century Indian singers